The Christopher Street–Sheridan Square station is a local station on the IRT Broadway–Seventh Avenue Line of the New York City Subway. Located at the intersection of Christopher Street and Seventh Avenue South in Manhattan, it is served by the 1 train at all times and by the 2 train during late nights.

The station was built by the Interborough Rapid Transit Company (IRT) as part of the Dual Contracts with New York City, and opened on July 1, 1918. The station had its platforms extended in the 1960s, and was renovated in 1991-1994.

History

Construction and opening

The Dual Contracts, which were signed on March 19, 1913, were contracts for the construction and/or rehabilitation and operation of rapid transit lines in the City of New York. The contracts were "dual" in that they were signed between the City and two separate private companies (the Interborough Rapid Transit Company and the Brooklyn Rapid Transit Company), all working together to make the construction of the Dual Contracts possible. The Dual Contracts promised the construction of several lines in Brooklyn. As part of Contract 4, the IRT agreed to build a branch of the original subway line south down Seventh Avenue, Varick Street, and West Broadway to serve the West Side of Manhattan.

The construction of this line, in conjunction with the construction of the Lexington Avenue Line, would change the operations of the IRT system. Instead of having trains go via Broadway, turning onto 42nd Street, before finally turning onto Park Avenue, there would be two trunk lines connected by the 42nd Street Shuttle. The system would be changed from looking like a "Z" system on a map to an "H" system. One trunk would run via the new Lexington Avenue Line down Park Avenue, and the other trunk would run via the new Seventh Avenue Line up Broadway. In order for the line to continue down Varick Street and West Broadway, these streets needed to be widened, and two new streets were built, the Seventh Avenue Extension and the Varick Street Extension. It was predicted that the subway extension would lead to the growth of the Lower West Side, and to neighborhoods such as Chelsea and Greenwich Village.

In August 1917, the Greenwich Village Public Service Committee requested that the New York Public Service Commission rename the station from Christopher Street to Christopher Street—Sheridan Square. The Public Service Commission voted to make the change on August 20, 1917.

Christopher Street–Sheridan Square opened as part of an extension of the line from 34th Street–Penn Station to South Ferry on July 1, 1918. Initially, the station was served by a shuttle running from Times Square to South Ferry. The new "H" system was implemented on August 1, 1918, joining the two halves of the Broadway–Seventh Avenue Line and sending all West Side trains south from Times Square. An immediate result of the switch was the need to transfer using the 42nd Street Shuttle in order to retrace the original layout. The completion of the "H" system doubled the capacity of the IRT system.

Later years
The city government took over the IRT's operations on June 12, 1940. On August 9, 1964, the New York City Transit Authority (NYCTA) announced the letting of a $7.6 million contract to lengthen platforms at stations on the Broadway—Seventh Avenue Line from Rector Street to 34th Street–Penn Station, including Christopher Street, and stations from Central Park North–110th Street to 145th Street on the Lenox Avenue Line to allow express trains to be lengthened from nine-car trains to ten-car trains, and to lengthen locals from eight-car trains to ten-car trains. With the completion of this project, the NYCTA project to lengthen IRT stations to accommodate ten-car trains would be complete.

In 1981, the Metropolitan Transportation Authority listed the station among the 69 most deteriorated stations in the subway system.

The station was renovated by in-house forces in 1994.

Station layout

This underground station has two side platforms and four tracks. The two center express tracks are used by the 2 and 3 trains during daytime hours.

Both platforms have the standard IRT trim line and mosaic name tablets reading "CHRISTOPHER ST. SHERIDAN SQ." on two lines. The columns are painted dark green with every other one having the standard black station name plate with white lettering. There are also signs directing to New York University.

The station features a site specific artwork, entitled Greenwich Village Murals, created in 1994 by Lower East Side artist, Lee Brozgol and the students of Public School 41. It features twelve mosaic frame panels on the platform walls depicting the history of Greenwich Village. The names of some of these panels include "Bohemians", "Rebels", "Founders", and "Providers".

Exits
Each platform has one fare control area at the center containing a turnstile bank and token booth. There is no free transfer between directions. The South Ferry-bound fare control has four street stairs to the diagonal intersection of Christopher Street and Seventh Avenue: two to the northwestern corner and two to the southwestern one. The Bronx-bound fare control has a single staircase to the island formed by Seventh Avenue, West Fourth Street, and Grove Street.

Nearby points of interest
The Stonewall National Monument, encompassing Christopher Park and the Stonewall Inn, is across West Fourth Street from the Bronx-bound entrance.

The Hess triangle, a small triangular-shaped plaque in the sidewalk with one  side and two  sides, is located outside the South Ferry-bound entrances at the southwest corner of Christopher Street and Seventh Avenue South.

In popular culture
In Bright Lights, Big City (1988), Michael J. Fox is seen jumping the turnstiles and then boarding a train at the station while running away from his brother.

In season 2, episode 5 of Friends (1995), filmed during the renovations of the station, the south entrance of the station is depicted as being closed.

The station can briefly be seen in the backdrop of the music video for David Bowie's "I'm Afraid of Americans" (1997).

The 1999 comedy movie Big Daddy includes a scene of Adam Sandler, his character's foster son, and friends outside this station.

The Steely Dan song Pixeleen from the Everything Must Go album, released in 2003, alludes to the subway station.

References

Further reading

External links 

 

Greenwich Village
IRT Broadway–Seventh Avenue Line stations
New York City Subway stations in Manhattan
Railway stations in the United States opened in 1918
1918 establishments in New York City
Christopher Street
Seventh Avenue (Manhattan)